Shaver Rental Houses District is a national historic district located at Salisbury, Rowan County, North Carolina.  The district encompasses four contributing buildings built as rental housing between 1899 and 1910.  They are one- and two-story, Queen Anne style frame dwellings.  Three of the houses on West Council Street feature asymmetrical massing, steeply pitched hipped roofs with cross gables, and one story wrap around porches.

It was listed on the National Register of Historic Places in 1988.

References

Houses on the National Register of Historic Places in North Carolina
Historic districts on the National Register of Historic Places in North Carolina
Queen Anne architecture in North Carolina
Houses in Salisbury, North Carolina
National Register of Historic Places in Rowan County, North Carolina